is a 1978 Japanese anime adventure-drama film adaptation of the storybook of the same name written by Takashi Yanase, the creator of Anpanman. It is most notable by fans and critics as a family film which makes a sharp, sudden turn into a dark and violent story that criticizes and reflects upon the theme of revenge and war. It is also recognized as one of the only Japanese shock films directed towards children and families.

Ringing Bell was produced by Sanrio and originally shown as a double feature alongside the US/Sanrio co-production The Mouse and his Child. It is Sanrio's first anime film to have a dark plot, only two films they co-produced with Sunrise, The Ideon: A Contact and The Ideon: Be Invoked – both of which serve as the conclusion to Yoshiyuki Tomino's Space Runaway Ideon, follow suit. Like the above-mentioned Ideon films, it is among Sanrio's first works to be aimed at young adult audience members in and outside Japan.

Synopsis 
A young lamb named Chirin lives a carefree life with his flock on a farm. He is adventurous and prone to getting lost, so he wears a bell around his neck so his mother can always find him. She warns him he must never venture beyond the farm's fence, or else he might be killed by the wolf that lives in the nearby mountains. Soon after, the wolf sneaks into the barn at night and attacks the sheep. Chirin's mother dies protecting him.

Seeking revenge, Chirin leaves the farm and pursues the wolf up the mountain. However, he quickly realizes he cannot fight him, and instead asks the wolf to train him to become strong. The wolf agrees, despite knowing Chirin intends to kill him one day.

Three years later, Chirin has transformed into a ruthless killer and thrown away his quest for vengeance, having come to view his mentor as a father figure. The wolf takes him down to the farm to kill the sheep, but, reminded of his mother, Chirin refuses. The two fight, and Chirin fatally wounds the wolf with his horns. Despite his mortal injury, the wolf happily confesses to Chirin that he is proud of his student's maturation, declaring that Chirin, like himself, is now a lone wolf.

Despite saving them, Chirin is rejected by his terrified flock and is forced to return to the mountains, now alone. After hallucinating the wolf's return, Chirin laments that he has nowhere left to go, and no one else to love, crying out in sorrow for the wolf to come back. Chirin is never seen again, but the faint ringing of his bell can still be heard on stormy nights, much like the howls of the lone wolves before him.

Characters 
 Chirin (チリン) - A young, cheerful and innocent lamb who has no understanding of life and death. He always wears a bell around his neck. As a result of his quest to kill the wolf, he grows into an antelope-like ram with grey wool and long horns, but is rejected by his friends as a result of his monstrous appearance.
 Chirin's mother - A ewe who is very loving towards her son Chirin. Her death at the paws of the Wolf sets the plot in motion.
 Wolf (ウォー Woe in the Japanese version) - An aging black wolf with a scar across one eye. The wolf lives in the mountains surrounding the farm and kills and eats his prey based on the belief that he must continue the cycle of nature.
 The other sheep - The nameless sheep on the farm are timid creatures who offer Chirin no comfort or support when his mother is killed. When Chirin returns as an adult, the flock immediately rejects him, horrified at what he has become (the English version has them not remembering who he is and are convinced that no beast like him could have lived with them).

Voice cast

Reception 
Though the film is not as well-known outside Japan, Western critics such as Justin Sevakis of Anime News Network praised the dark storyline and artwork, and noted that it delivered a "sort of quick punch-to-the-face of the innocent." Sevakis also commented that "there is almost nothing uplifting about Ringing Bell and yet it maintains its sense of adorable while simultaneously destroying our concepts of the beauty of nature."

References

Further reading

External links 

 
 English translation of the original book
 The entire film on Crunchyroll

1978 films
1978 anime films
1978 drama films
1970s adventure films
1970s children's adventure films
1970s children's animated films
1970s children's fantasy films
1970s fantasy drama films
1970s fantasy adventure films
1970s Japanese-language films
Animated adventure films
Animated drama films
Animated films about wolves
Animated films about revenge
Animated films based on children's books
Anti-war films
Children's drama films
Discotek Media
Films about sheep
Films based on Japanese novels
Films directed by Masami Hata
Films set on farms
Hunting in popular culture
Japanese animated fantasy films
Japanese children's films
Japanese fantasy drama films
Japanese fantasy adventure films
Japanese independent films
Sanrio
Fictional sheep
Films about mother–son relationships
Films about orphans